The inornate squirrel (Callosciurus inornatus) is a species of rodent in the family Sciuridae.
It is found in China, Laos, and Vietnam.

References

Notes

Thorington, R. W. Jr. and R. S. Hoffman. 2005. Family Sciuridae. pp. 754–818 in Mammal Species of the World a Taxonomic and Geographic Reference. D. E. Wilson and D. M. Reeder eds. Johns Hopkins University Press, Baltimore.
 www.thewebsiteofeverything.com

Callosciurus
Mammals described in 1867
Taxa named by John Edward Gray
Taxonomy articles created by Polbot